Mount Manger is a snow-covered mountain located  northwest of Mount Josephine in the Alexandra Mountains, on King Edward VII Peninsula, Antarctica. The mountain was photographed from the air and roughly mapped by the Byrd Antarctic Expedition, 1928–30, and was named by the Advisory Committee on Antarctic Names (at the suggestion of Rear Admiral Richard E. Byrd) for William Manger, of the family that owned the Manger Hotel chain, who assisted Byrd expeditions by providing free room for office space and for expedition personnel.

References

Mountains of King Edward VII Land